Joshua Lee Williams (born August 3, 1993) is an American professional stock car racing driver and team owner. As a driver, he competes full-time in the NASCAR Xfinity Series driving the No. 92 Chevrolet Camaro for DGM Racing. He has also previously competed in the NASCAR Truck Series and the ARCA Menards Series. As a team owner, he owns Josh Williams Motorsports, which fields cars for development drivers in ARCA, late model racing, legends car racing and bandolero racing.

Racing career

Early years
Williams started his racing career in go-kart racing and later raced Fastrucks and Legends cars to advance his early career, eventually earning a berth in the 2009 edition of "Humpy's Heroes", a summer driver development program run by Humpy Wheeler for young drivers.

ARCA Racing Series

Williams drove five races in the 2010 ARCA Racing Series in his family car, numbered 02. He recorded the best finish of 15th at Iowa Speedway. Williams caught the attention of those in the racing community with those performances, as he ran three races for Andy Belmont the following year and another three for his family team, which later developed an alliance with Lira Motorsports. Williams recorded two top-tens in Belmont's car and one more in his own car. For 2012, Williams took his Josh Williams Motorsports team full-time, running all but one race while having limited funding. He failed to finish three races and had four top tens with a best finish of seventh.

The 2013 season was a struggle, to begin with for Williams, who remained sponsorless through the first five races of the season despite having two top ten finishes. He then signed a four race deal with Roulo Brothers Racing, making sporadic appearances in their Ford racecars. Running in between races for Roulo with his family team, Williams was signed by Frank Kimmel to drive one of his cars at Road America, starting and parking. Williams drove the next race for GMS Racing, again start and parking at Michigan International Speedway. Williams carried the sponsorship from Allegiant Air for the rest of the year, grabbing his first top-five finish (a second at Chicagoland Speedway). He finished fifth in points while utilizing four teams to get there.

Again hampered by limited funding, Williams scaled back to just over half the schedule in 2014, always running near or in the top ten. He scored another runner-up finish in the season's penultimate race. He raced the full season with the number six in 2015, except for one race with Cunningham Motorsports. He only finished outside of the top ten in five races and finished third in the driver's standings, behind Grant Enfinger and Austin Wayne Self, who passed Williams for second during the final race. 2016 brought new success for Williams, as he won his first two races, at Madison International Speedway and Nashville Fairgrounds Speedway. The Madison win came after he blew an engine in the previous contests and considered withdrawing from Madison; his crew pulled an all-nighter during the week to get the engine prepared. He finished fifth in points after an inconsistent season with 11 top tens.

Williams had said that he would have liked to run more ARCA Racing Series races in 2017. His team ran two races at the beginning of the season in a partnership with Lira Motorsports, and Williams himself went behind the wheel for the annual Salem Speedway throwback weekend, running fourth.

Williams returned once again in the 2018 season behind the wheel of the No. 6 Chevrolet at Talladega in a partnership between his own team and Our Motorsports. They finished 5th.

National series
Williams and family made one Camping World Truck Series start in a partnership with T3R2 Racing, falling out at Martinsville Speedway in 2014. He made two Xfinity Series starts as a start and park driver in 2016, one for Jimmy Means Racing and one for King Autosport. He was announced as the driver of King's No. 90 entry for the spring Bristol Motor Speedway Xfinity race on April 21, 2017. Longtime friend Mario Gosselin helped Williams get the ride. Along with the Bristol race, Williams wanted to run about six Truck races for his family team in 2017. The Truck races never came, but Williams garnered six other starts split between King's 90 and 92 cars, mostly starting and parking in the 92 and running full races in the 90. At Daytona in summer, Williams was running just outside the top ten before he was clipped by Daniel Suárez, finishing last. Williams broke the top thirty in all of his full races.

For 2018, Williams took over the majority of the races in the No. 90 and served as crew chief for drivers of the 90 like Donald Theetge and Andy Lally most weekends when he was not in the seat.

On January 29, 2019, it was announced that Williams would move over to DGM's No. 36 car for the 2019 NASCAR Xfinity Series season. After gambling on pit strategy, Williams finished a then-career-best sixteenth in the Boyd Gaming 300 in early March. He later improved on that career-best with his first career top-ten, an eighth at Talladega Superspeedway in the spring. The finish helped Williams and DGM bounce back from a sponsor who failed to pay the team in the beginning portions of the year.

Williams returned to DGM in 2020, piloting the team's No. 92 entry. He reeled off two top-ten finishes in the month of October, including a career-best sixth-place finish at Kansas Speedway that came only a day after the death of one of Williams' employees. On October 31, Williams and the team confirmed another full-season effort in 2021. Following the 2021 season, Williams and DGM parted with Williams taking an opportunity that will help him reach racing on Sundays.

In December 2021, it was announced that Williams would drive the No. 78 in 2022 for B. J. McLeod Motorsports.

On April 12, 2022, it was announced that Williams would make his first career NASCAR Cup Series start at the 2022 Food City Dirt Race, and will drive the No. 78 for Live Fast Motorsports.

On August 22, 2022, Williams announced that he would be returning to his old No. 92 for DGM. He would drive that car as well as the team's No. 36 car for the rest of 2022. In 2023, Williams returned to the No. 92 car full-time. At Atlanta, he sustained heavy damage on lap 27; when debris from his repaired car caused another caution, NASCAR parked him under the Damaged Vehicle Policy. In response, Williams stopped his car on the start/finish line and walked back to pit road.

Personal life
Williams was born in Florida but moved to the Charlotte area at age 15, taking online classes to get through high school while racing. As a teen, Williams was injured in a head-on four-wheeler collision and spent five days in the ICU. Williams visits children's hospitals to give back to the community in his free time. Williams, with his wife Trazia Rae, owns a company that prepares foreclosed homes for auction, which he works at during the week while racing.

Motorsports career results

NASCAR
(key) (Bold – Pole position awarded by qualifying time. Italics – Pole position earned by points standings or practice time. * – Most laps led.)

Cup Series

Xfinity Series

Camping World Truck Series

 Season still in progress
 Ineligible for series points

ARCA Racing Series
(key) (Bold – Pole position awarded by qualifying time. Italics – Pole position earned by points standings or practice time. * – Most laps led.)

References

External links
 
 

1993 births
Racing drivers from Florida
NASCAR drivers
ARCA Menards Series drivers
Living people